is an open-air folk museum in Fuchū, Tokyo. It features buildings of historical note from various times in Japanese history.

References

External links
Kyodo no mori - in Japanese
Photoguide

Museums in Tokyo
Parks and gardens in Tokyo
Open-air museums in Japan
Fuchū, Tokyo